Océan Lock is a single chamber lock on the Canal du Midi. The adjacent locks are Mediterranee Lock 5190 metres to the east and Emborrel Lock 4157 metres to the west. Ocean Lock marks the start of the summit section of the canal when travelling west to east.

It is located in the commune of Montferrand, Aude.

See also
Locks on the Canal du Midi
Seuil de Naurouze

Locks on the Canal du Midi